The 2015 season was BEC Tero Sasana's 19th season in the Thai Premier League.

Pre-season and friendlies

Toyota Premier Cup

BEC Tero Sasana will be playing against Sagan Tosu in the 2015 Toyota Premier Cup. BEC Tero Sasana won the 2015 Toyota Premier Cup 4-3 from a penalty shootout.

Thai Premier League

Thai FA Cup
Chang FA Cup

Thai League Cup
Toyota League Cup

Squad statistics

Transfers
First Thai footballer's market is opening on 6 November 2014 to 28 January 2015.

Second Thai footballer's market is opening on 3 June 2015 to 30 June 2015.

In

Out

Loan in

Loan out

References

Bur
2015